The sixth season of Food Paradise, an American food reality television series narrated by Jess Blaze Snider (formally Mason Pettit) on the Travel Channel, premiered on April 8, 2015. First-run episodes of the series aired in the United States on the Travel Channel on Mondays at 10:00 p.m. EDT. The season contained 6 episodes and concluded airing on April 22, 2015.

Food Paradise features the best places to find various cuisines at food locations across America. Each episode focuses on a certain type of restaurant, such as "Diners", "Bars", "Drive-Thrus" or "Breakfast" places that people go to find a certain food specialty.

Episodes 

Note: This season features half-hour episodes of the previous season's restaurant specialties.

References

External links
Food Paradise @Travelchannel.com

2015 American television seasons